George Sebastian Kelbel (born 6 August 1992) is a German-Ghanaian footballer who most recently played as a forward for Teutonia Ottensen.

Career
Kelbel made his professional debut for Holstein Kiel in the 3. Liga on 25 October 2013, coming on as a substitute in the 79th minute for Casper Johansen in the 0–0 away draw against SpVgg Unterhaching.

References

External links
 
 
 Holstein Kiel II statistics at Fussball.de

1992 births
Living people
Footballers from Hamburg
German footballers
Ghanaian footballers
German sportspeople of Ghanaian descent
Association football forwards
Altonaer FC von 1893 players
Hamburger SV II players
Holstein Kiel players
Holstein Kiel II players
Goslarer SC 08 players
Berliner AK 07 players
TSV Havelse players
Lüneburger SK Hansa players
TSG Neustrelitz players
FC Rot-Weiß Erfurt players
George Kelbel
George Kelbel
FC Teutonia Ottensen players
3. Liga players
Regionalliga players
German expatriate footballers
Ghanaian expatriate footballers
German expatriate sportspeople in Thailand
Ghanaian expatriate sportspeople in Thailand
Expatriate footballers in Thailand